This article is a list of characters from the 2002 anime series Kiddy Grade.

Main characters

Éclair

Éclair (Lightning) works for the Galactic Organization of Trade and Tariffs or GOTT for short. While her primary job is to be a receptionist, her job also incorporates being sent on missions as an ES member of the so-called "Shadow Unit" in order to ensure normal economic operation on the various planets around the Galaxy. She does this with the assistance of her younger partner and fellow receptionist Lumière, her Guard robot Donnerschlag and the space-ship La Muse.  She is 165 cm tall, her three sizes (in cm) are 80-54-85, her favourite foods are celery and carrots and her favourite phrase is "Que será, será".

Known for her childish nature, she often dresses up in either a skimpy or amusing, but loosely related to the situation, costume. For instance when she was sent to take a letter of attorney to the Faunusian government, she dressed up in a pizza delivery outfit, and placed the letter in a pizza box. She also has a tendency to shout "Ta-da!" (じゃっじゃ～ん！) whenever she arrives on the scene to arrest someone or instances when she surprises or saves Lumière. Her rash nature also often makes her overreact to situations, for instance, in one instance she could not get official arrest authorization and jumped off and pursued to destroy many robots. This lack of composure often makes Lumière say "A Lady should be more elegant", also later Mrs. Padushka also states "You're so rash, how will you ever find a husband?"  Despite this she is naturally honest and direct, and tries to remain cheerful even when on assignment. Although she is hot-headed and immature, Éclair is also very sweet, caring, willing to help others, and loves children whether it be friend or stranger. This gentle tendency has got her and Lumière pursued by GOTT because she defied her orders by helping the civilians when on an enforcement mission to support the dictator.

Éclair possesses great physical strength which borders on the ridiculous, and also uses her lipstick whip often in battle. Her lipstick deserves note, if she draws with it on a surface, the drawn lipstick is actually so tough and rubbery that she can lift it off the surface and use it as a whip, or in one instance to make two ropes to stop of mob of people opposing the Nouvlesse. Her lipstick serves another purpose, as she uses self-hypnotic suggestion so that she can only really use her immense strength when she wears lipstick. In at least one extreme circumstance, she substituted some of her own blood from an injury for the lipstick to achieve the same effect. Éclair is at first believed to be part cyborg, her "enhancements" letting her move so fast as to appear to teleport from place to place. The nature of these "enhancements" are not explained at first and are typically attributed to her ES ability: "Power". "Power" also enables her to heal rapidly from most types of wounds, so she's known as "The ES Agent who cannot die", not a cyborg. Later in the series, she reveals the true extent of her "Power", which are actually G-Class, which allow her to hover, and create spheres or waves of concussive forces, as well as shielding. Her favoured weapon is a custom .45 caliber model Walther P99.

Later in the series it is realized that in fact Éclair is roughly 250 years old and has been "reborn" several times. This is revealed when she gets so close to the Dardanos mind control center that she has flash-backs to her past lives, in all of them she worked for the GOTT, and is also the adopted mother of the head of the Galactic Union (who would not be older than her, if she was not reborn) Chevalier D'Autriche.  It is shown later that the burden of the acts she has performed in the service of various powers at times has become too much for her to bear and she has had her memories erased before the series began. When in possession of all her memories her true G-Class powers are unlocked (as well as the self-hypnotic limitation, allowing her to use her abilities at will).  Éclair was killed and had her abilities absorbed by Alv during the assault on GOTT headquarters, but was recreated by Eclipse later on using her "Quantum Leap" ability.

Lumière

Lumière (Light in French) is a GOTT receptionist and ES member like her partner Éclair. Lumière has little to no physical abilities. She instead makes up for this with her adept, controlled mind, her wit and her ability to control any computer unit. Even though she is physically younger than Éclair she is far more mature, from the way she dresses, from her politeness, to her tastes (she likes the opera and fine wine). She is always trying to convince Éclair to be more ladylike through her catch-phrase "A Lady should really be more elegant". Lumière also possesses a friendship with the AI unit of the La Muse, Wirbelwind, which she created. Her computer abilities do not manifest in the typing sense, as long as she touch an electric circuit she can bring it under control just using her mind. She doesn't even need to touch an object to interact with it, as her "Puppet" ability allows her to manipulate "strings" of nanites towards the object, allowing her to link with it from a distance. She also manifests herself into the digital space and can also spawn Mini-Lumière's to assist her in data collection tasks and the such. Her skills are so impressive that she can break through 3,786 firewalls in less than ten minutes, or can even bring a planet's environment terraforming system under her control. While on the run with Éclair, she was even able to defeat the D-Command (an electronic warfare program designed to incapacitate rogue ES agents) by hacking her own nanites so as to develop an immunity.

Lumière is often the person who sits at the side during missions, she spends a lot more bonding time with Armbrust than Éclair. She is also far more intelligent than Éclair (at least with Éclair's mental blocks in place) and on numerous occasions, things that are obvious to Lumière and the audience are not obvious to Éclair, but she has more than one experience when her life was in major danger because she has no physical ability. Her weapon of choice is a COP 357 Derringer.

Lumière has also been the subject of numerous rebirths over the last 200 years, but unlike Éclair, has never had her memories erased, explaining her maturity and experience. It is not described if they are reborn at the same time or separately, but in one flashback, Lumière is shown showing Éclair the ropes around the GOTT after Éclair had her memories erased. Lumière takes this fact far better than Éclair, who has been shown to have had fits over this. Her true power, the G Class ability "Particle" enables her to control matter at the subatomic level. At one point she uses it to reconstruct her own body after it is atomized in a power supply unit.  When she reorganizes her own particles, she takes on the form of a much taller, adult version of herself so as to allow her body to have capacity to use her power again after having lost the use of it.  This is quite taxing however, as she was only able to sustain it for a short time.  Lumière was killed and had her abilities absorbed by Dvergr during the assault on GOTT headquarters, but was recreated by Eclipse later on using her "Quantum Leap" ability.

Armbrust

Armbrust (German for "Crossbow") is 36 years old and an Auditor for the Global Union. He is sent to observe Éclair and Lumière on their missions at the outset of the series.

Calm and collected and somewhat of a ladies' man, Armbrust is frequently the target of Éclair's distrust, in spite of his efforts and good intentions. Unlike her partner, Lumière frequently comes to his defense. Later it is revealed that Armbrust is actually an S Class ES Member whose partner is Pfeilspitze (also known as Mercredi). His ever-present briefcase represents his special ES ability (codenamed "Black Box").

Armbrust is mis-translated as Armblast in the English dub, though it is spelled correctly in the English subtitled version.

Eclipse

Eclipse is the Chief of Galactic Organization of Trade and Tariffs (GOTT).  Her job is to ensure normal economic activity on all of the planets in the Galaxy, she operates, to an extent under the guise of the Galactic Union.  Mainly she ensures this by sending of various groups of people or ES members to either fight, arrest, seize, destroy or assist in order to achieve the goal of normal economic activity.  An ES member cannot disobey a direct order from Chief Eclipse, and by doing so this results in a Purge.  For instance in Episode 1 she sends a Letter of Attorney to allow trade to pass to Faunus and Medea (a military blockade stops this), in Episode 2 to stop illegal production of High G a gravity control material, and thus to allow normal production.  In Episode 3 they must escort prisoners in charge of extradition back to the GOTT head office.

In each of these instances she sends out an ES team.  She never gets directly involved.  Though in order for the members to make an arrest they must seek permission through her.  Her true job, and what she spends most of her time doing, is never clear.  Her superior is Chevalier D'Autrice and her secretary is the number-crunching expert Mercredi.

Later in the series when there are odd, potentially evil, goings on at the GOTT, it is assumed to be from her.  But she is only a pawn through which those at work act, as she has no choice but to obey her superiors.

Eclipse's personality is one of collected calm and eloquence, for this she is greatly admired by Éclair.  She rarely speaks her mind and if so it is out of obligation too. She never says a word wrong and smoothly operates the GOTT.  Even in anger she is reasonable, but when she is expected to carry out actions she doesn't often do them willingly, another indication that she never speaks her mind. She is also caring towards the teenagers who are the ES members. She often says something along the lines of "I will be looking forward to your safe return". Her other catch-phrase is "Éclair, Lumière, arrest authorization granted".

Eclipse is an ES-Member herself, contemporary with Éclair and Lumière, and her G Class ability is known as "Kvant" (Russian for quantum).  It is this ability that enables the ES-Members to be "reborn", as she is able to quantize the soul itself and transfer it from body to body in a process called encoding. She is also able to perform quantum jumps, or teleportation, over short distances.

Mercredi

Mercredi (French for Wednesday), although aged only 13, is Eclipse's Private Secretary and can be considered to be her "right-hand girl".  She is extremely talented at data gathering and her abilities almost rival a computer.  The job also gives her time to hang out with a lot of the ES Members and she's a friend of Éclair and Lumière.  Mercredi also excels at making tea, and usually fixes a batch for Éclair and Lumière after each of their missions.  Mercredi goes missing when the GOTT towers are destroyed and is presumed dead, however she turns up again in the rebuilt GOTT building without her usual uniform.  In actuality her true codename is Pfeilspitze (German, "arrowhead"), and has been working as a double agent inside the GOTT for her partner, Armbrust.

Other ES members

Alv and Dvergr

Alv 

Alv is an ES member of the GOTT, or the Galactic Organisation of Trade and Tariffs.  She works with her partner Dvergr to ensure normal economic activity in the Galaxy in which the anime is set. Alv is the more vocal of the pair and disliked by most ES members, specifically Tweedledee and Éclair. As an S Class ES Member, she is particularly powerful.

She claims she works for herself, but is willing to play the pawn when it suits her needs. She shows no particular affection or empathy for anyone, not even Dvergr, who is later revealed to be her own mother. She also takes pleasure in killing people and shows no remorse for her actions. Alv ultimately reveals that the source of her hatred and misanthropy are the Nouvlesse, whom she blames for her pain, suffering and humiliation, as well as the countless lives she's lived acting as one of their puppets.

Alv and Dvergr both have the power of Reflex and Absorb. To escape a gravity bomb, they activate "Reflex," which allows them to act normally, in spite of the increased gravity. "Absorb" is only available when both Alv and Dvergr activate it; it allows them to absorb virtually anything, from energy to people, allowing them access to their appearance and abilities.

At the conclusion of the series, Alv breaks up into particles on the Deucalion and transforms into energy to become one with the colossal ship. In preparing to destroy Earth in her new form, Alv is defeated by all the ES members. After her defeat and the destruction of the Deucalion, Alv (from inside the ruins of the ship) can be heard crying and calling out to her mother as Dvergr consoles her just minutes before they both sink into the Sun.

Dvergr

(Nordic, Dwarf) - GOTT ES Member (S Class), apparent age 19, partner to Alv. Special abilities: "Absorb," "Reflex," and "Transmission."

Dvergr is Alv's partner. Her personality is extremely subdued; her dialogue consists primarily of who, what, where, when, how or why. She appears to be more level-headed than her counterpart and does not partake in Alv's jeering of other ES members. She is also averse to unnecessary bloodshed, as made apparent when she protects Chevalier from Alv on board the Deucalion. Dvergr's motivations and intentions are never revealed, but unlike Alv, she is unwilling to abandon her partner and daughter.

Dverger later reveals her status as Alv's mother. Dvergr reveals in the final episode a hidden third power called "Transmission" and comments that she has only ever used it on Alv. Eclipse describes it as "a reversal of her 'Absorb' abilities." It is unknown whether Alv shares this power or if it is unique to Dvergr.

At the climax of the series, as the ES members engage Alv, now reborn as the Deucalion itself, Dvergr surrenders the information necessary for Lumière and Éclair to defeat her daughter. After she imparts her "gift" of "Transmission" to Éclair, she uses some of La Muses power to travel to the ruins of the Deucalion, now either orbiting or approaching into the sun. On board, Dvergr consoles her daughter, defeated and trapped inside the derelict starship.

Tweedledee and Tweedledum

Tweedledee
(From Lewis Carrol's Through the Looking-Glass, and What Alice Found There) - GOTT ES Member (S Class), apparent age 16, partner and twin of Tweedledum. Special ability: "Strom" (German, stream or current, as in "Electricity"), joint ability: "Windstoß" (German, gust of wind).

Tweedledee, who is both the sister and partner of Tweedledum, has a commanding presence and values loyalty above all else. She is an "S Class" ES Member rivaling Alv and Dvergr. Tweedledee has the ability to control electricity and can create an effect similar to Lumière's Puppet. She often scolds her brother for calling her "sister" while on duty. Tweedledee also has a strong sense of pride. While she doesn't agree with Eclipse's secretive nature towards the ES Members, she still trusts her. She also seems to have a deep bond with Lumière, probably because of their similar abilities.

Tweedledum
(From Lewis Carrol's Through the Looking-Glass, and What Alice Found There) - GOTT ES Member (S Class), apparent age 16, partner and twin of Tweedledee. Special ability: "Magnetfeld" (German, magnetic field), joint ability: "Windstoß" (German, gust of wind).

Tweedledum, who is both the brother and partner of Tweedledee, is fiercely loyal to his sister. However, he isn't really sociable with anyone else other than Tweedledee. Although he doesn't mean to offend, Tweedledum doesn't really show interest in anyone else other than his sister. Tweedledum has the ability to control the magnetic fields around him, combining with Tweedledee to create a powerful gravitational force. Because of their extremely strong bond, Tweedledum seems jealous when his sister shows interest in Lumière.

Viola and Cesario

Viola
(From Shakespeare's Twelfth Night) - GOTT ES Member (C Class), apparent age 9, partner to Cesario. Special ability: "Calamity".

The youngest member of the ES Force, Viola is one of the more precocious members. She also seems to be the main voice of her partnership with Cesario. She often gives the other ES Members nicknames. Viola is also a "C Class" member and, although Éclair and Lumière are actually G-class, can prove to be a powerful adversity to Éclair and Lumière. Her power "Calamity", which allows her to disperse matter at the molecular level. The ability requires a great deal of energy and is supplied by Cesario's "Driver" ability; therefore, Viola can only use her ability when she is in physical contact with Cesario. Viola is also often seen with a cute stuffed animal named Dragon Papi. She enjoys Italian food and argues with Cesario about where to eat.

Cesario

(From Shakespeare's Twelfth Night) - GOTT ES Member (C Class), apparent age 18, partner to Viola. Special ability: "Driver".

Cesario is the older partner of Viola. He is seen to be a mostly silent person, almost never speaking out loud. Instead, he is usually seen communicating to Viola by whispering in her ear. Cesario seems to prefer communicating with body language instead of voice. He is often an indecisive person, usually on the losing side of his arguments with Viola. His power, "Driver", has no use on its own but when in contact with Viola, it serves as a source of energy for her ability.  In contrast to Viola, he likes Chinese food, though he frequently winds up letting Viola have her way on where they eat.

Un-ou and A-ou

Un-ou

(Japanese/Sanskrit, 吽王, one of the two Buddhist Deva Kings) - GOTT ES Member (S Class), apparent age 14, partner to A-ou. Special ability: "Amazing".

A mostly cynical and impulsive person, Un-ou enjoys the danger that comes with his job. He and A-ou were formerly mercenaries who were constantly at odds with Éclair and Lumière. Hardened by his past as a mercenary, Un-ou doesn't seem to agree with the values held by the GOTT, but merely as an outlet from their past rivalries with Éclair and Lumière. His relationship with Éclair is especially competitive. Un-ou's "Amazing" ability allows him to listen to the various life energies which allow them to track down their enemies.

A-ou

(Japanese/Sanskrit, 阿王, one of the two Buddhist Deva Kings) - GOTT ES Member (S Class), apparent age 19, partner to Un-ou. Special ability: "Amplifier".

The older and more stoic member of the Duo, A-ou (unlike his partner) has a stronger sense of honor and justice. He is also more of a pacifist and he often speaks in a profound and meaningful manner, giving him a rather preachy presence among other people. He and Un-ou have had a long and eventful past together during their days as mercenaries. However, despite their differences, the two have forged a strong bond as a team. "Amplifier" gives him the ability to improve his visual perception tenfold, as well as to see the light of people's lives and how that dims when they die. He also uses the energy seen by Un-ou to increase the power of his physical attacks.

Sinistra and Dextera

SinistraSinistra (Latin for left) - GOTT ES Member (S Class), apparent age 18, partner to Dextera. Special ability: "Whenever".

Among this handsome duo of ES Members, Sinistra appears to be the silent type, but he is really a sociable person. He is also very chivalrous. Whenever he is in battle, he is calm, collected and fearless. His ability appears to be energy manipulation, however its only used when his partner is present. They each unleash an energy burst that is the same color as their hair.

DexteraDextera (Latin for right) - GOTT ES Member (S Class), partner to Sinistra. Special ability: "Anywhere".

Dextera has a reputation for being the victor of numerous battles in the past. He also has strong leadership characteristics. The right-hand man of Eclipse, he has a long period of respect among the GOTT. The abilities of both him and Sinistra seem to be a mystery. However, both have plenty of strength and speed.

Minor charactersLiquide "Liquiy" Cole (Ricki in the English dub) is a GOTT receptionist who works (and is friends) with Éclair and Lumière at the front gate of GOTT Headquarters. She often hangs out with Éclair outside of work and is there for her whenever she needs help. Her name is from the French for liquid. Voiced by Elise Baughman in the English dub and by Ikue Kimura in the Japanese dub.Bonita Gerard is another GOTT receptionist who works with Liquiy, Éclair and Lumière. Voiced by Meredith McCoy in the English dub and Mami Kosuge in the Japanese dub. Bonita means pretty in Spanish.Caprice is a friend of Éclair who works as a waitress at Fleur's Cafe. Not seen very often during the series, but it is implied that they have also had a long friendship. Melissa Ellis dubs her in the English version.Mrs. Padushka is another friend of Éclair and an SO member of GOTT. She is shown to be very nervous.  She retires from the GOTT in order to devote her time to family life with her husband, Gluck. She also gave birth to a baby girl, which she names after Éclair. However, she never learned about Éclair being an ES member until she left GOTT. Her name is pseudo-Russian, probably derived from podushka, "pillow". Her husband's name can mean either "luck" or "happiness" in German (Glück). In the English dub, Lauren Goode voiced her.Chevalier d'Autriche, at 56, is the Secretary General of the GOTT and head of the GU Economic Dept. Despite the fact that he's a Nouvlesse, Chevalier is a key figure to Éclair's past and her forgotten former lives. In his lifetime, he has never forgotten Éclair and is always willing to help her. He worked his way up to his current position all for Éclair's sake (it is revealed late in the show that Chevalier is Éclair's adopted son.) His name is French, literally meaning "Knight of Austria". Voiced by Christopher R. Sabat in the English dub and by Norio Wakamoto in the Japanese dub.Vendredi is a GOTT SO member who replaces Mercredi as Eclipse's secretary later in the series. She wears the same uniform and wig as Mercredi, so Vendredi looks very similar to her predecessor. Her name is French for Friday. Also voiced by Gwendolyn Lau in the English dub.Franz is a young doctor who helped Éclair recover from an injury many decades ago when they were help fighting a civil war on a space outpost. It is hinted that Franz and Éclair showed mutual interests in each other but since he was a human it would've never worked out. Although he promised Éclair and Lumière that he would always be there to help them no matter how many years passed. Hence he built a secret underground medical facility in his hospital, hoping that they will be able to find it many years later.

Non-human Kiddy Grade characters

 Donnerschlag is Éclair and Lumière's guard robot. Support machinery with escort mode, avian-humanoid form, and vehicle mode. Also functions as Éclair's "solid shell", keeping a record of all her experiences, activities and genetic information. Name means thunderclap in German.
 The La Muse is Éclair and Lumière's spacecraft. High speed cruiser ID SSC2045343. Capable of independent warp and fitted with an "inertial drive" system that boosts acceleration to theoretically infinite levels and also functions as a shield by bending space around the ship. Named after the Muses of Greek legend.
 Wirbelwind is the name of the artificially intelligent quantum computer (AI) that controls La Muse and supports Lumière in a manner similar to a "solid shell", recording all her memories, experiences and genetic information. Originally designed from the AI of a robot that was almost destroyed but rescued by Lumière. Name means whirlwind in German.
 Cheshire Cat (aka C-Square) - Tweedledee and Tweedledum's spacecraft. High speed cruiser. Named after the character in Lewis Carroll's novel Alice's Adventures in Wonderland, it is capable of stealth operations using "phase elevate" by phasing out of normal space leaving only a small periscope visible, like the eponymous cat's grin.
 Dodo - Tweedledee and Tweedledum's guard robot. Support machinery with a vehicle mode, an optional assault body, and possibly other mission-specific optional add-on bodies. Name after an extinct, flightless bird, most likely in relation to the dodo from Lewis Carroll's Alice's Adventures in Wonderland.
 Salyut - A-ou and Un-ou's spacecraft. High speed cruiser, equipped with an inertial drive and a powerful sensor array.
 Ganador - A-ou and Un-ou's guard robot. Name means "winner" in Spanish.
 Svart - Alv and Dvergr's spacecraft. High speed cruiser. Equipped with advanced stealth capabilities. Name means "black" in Swedish.
 Thor - Alv and Dvergr's guard robot. Support machinery with two possible forms: "aggressive" form and "high-speed" form. It cannot transform like other guard robots, is equipped with only a rudimentary AI and, since it was manufactured after the limitations on such technology was imposed, does not function as a solid shell. Named after the Norse god of thunder.
 Fenice - The Golden Ship, Fenice, is the high speed cruiser used by GOTT ES members, Viola and Cesario.  Name means "phoenix" in Italian, a reference to a ship mentioned in Twelfth Night.
 Titano - Titano is a guard ship robot that supports Viola and Cesario. Titano's body is armored in super-crystalline monomolecular armor and its major emphasis is on its defenses.
 Centurion - Sinistra and Dextera's high speed cruiser. This ship has the ability to split apart into two separate ships, one controlled by Sinistra and the other controlled by Dextera. The main weapon for this ship is the One Dimensional Blade that is located between the two ships when they are apart. This weapon can slice through virtually anything.
 Zephyrus' - Sinistra and Dextera's guard robot. Name may refer to Zephyrus, the West Wind in Greek mythology.

References

External links
 
 
 
 Kiddy Grade (Kiddy Girl-and) - WORKS ON WEB- 

Kiddy Grade
Kiddy Grade